The 1919 Tour de France was the 13th edition of Tour de France, one of cycling's Grand Tours. The Tour began in Paris with a flat stage on 29 June, and Stage 9 occurred on 15 July with a mountainous stage from Marseille. The race finished in Paris on 27 July.

Stage 9
15 July 1919 — Marseille to Nice,

Stage 10
17 July 1919 — Nice to Grenoble,

Stage 11
19 July 1919 — Grenoble to Geneva, 

Eugene Christophe wore the first ever Tour de France race leader's yellow jersey, from the start of the stage.

Stage 12
21 July 1919 — Geneva to Strasbourg,

Stage 13
23 July 1919 — Strasbourg to Metz,

Stage 14
25 July 1919 — Metz to Dunkerque,

Stage 15
27 July 1919 — Dunkerque to Paris,

References

1919 Tour de France
Tour de France stages